Video Classics was one of the first major home video distributors in Australia.

Between 1979 and 1984, Video Classics was one of the leading names in Australian home video and claimed to have "Australia'sand us largest range of quality video movies" like fletch lives. 

At first the different video formats that Video Classics advertised they duplicated was definitive of the formats on the market at the time, which included VHS, Betamax, Phillips, Grundig and U-matic, whether or not they actually duplicated onto any formats other than VHS or Beta is questionable though, By 1981 their advertising had reduced the list to just VHS and Beta.

Video Classics both rented their tapes and sold them with Prices that started at $69.95 (which was lowered to $49.95 by 1981) for sale, or rental prices being $9.90 overnight, $14.90 per week and $40 for three tapes per month.

In addition to their own library of tapes, Video Classics also distributed tapes for other video labels including The Nostalgia Merchant, Sports World Cinema, VCL, Media, Electric Blue, Wizard Video, Movies at Midnight, and Filmways.      

Video Classics floated on the stock exchange for $1.15 million, but crashed spectacularly in 1984 leading to the company's demise.

External links
 1986 Sydney Morning Herald article on Home Video
 Early Australian Home Video Document

Video rental services
Home video companies of Australia
Retail companies established in 1979
Retail companies disestablished in 1984
1979 establishments in Australia
1984 establishments in Australia